Jeremy Davidson (born Jeremy Michael Greenberg; December 24, 1971) is an American actor, writer, and director.

Career
He has been featured as Jack Randall, Kitty's love interest in the television series Brothers & Sisters. He appeared in five seasons of the Lifetime series Army Wives as MSG Chase Moran. He played recurring characters on the ABC TV 2011-12 series Pan Am, the NBC TV 2013 series Do No Harm, and season 6 of the USA Network series Royal Pains.

Personal life
Davidson is married to actress Mary Stuart Masterson; the couple has four children. They met in 2004 during a production of Cat on a Hot Tin Roof and married two years later. He was previously married to Shari Berkowitz.

Selected filmography

Film

Television

References

1971 births
Male actors from New York (state)
American male film actors
American male television actors
Living people
Place of birth missing (living people)
20th-century American male actors
21st-century American male actors